Islamic Republic of Iran Air Force
 Islamic Revolutionary Guard Corps Aerospace Force